Colorado Pride is an American women's soccer club that was founded in 1994. The team is a 2016 inaugural member of United Women's Soccer. They played in the W-League in 2014 and 2015.

Year-by-year

Head coaches
  Daniel Clitnovici (2014) 
  Sian Hudson (2015)

Awards
Chloe Logarzo - 2014 W-League Rookie of the Year
Daniel Clitnovici  - 2014 W-League Coach of the Year 

Tara Andrews - 2015 USL W-League MVP and Golden Boot Award

Britt Eckerstrom -2015 W-League Goalkeeper of the Year

Roster

2015 
Head Coach: Daniel Clitnovici

Assistant Coach and General manager: Sian Hudson

Assistant Coach and Director of Operations: Kristie Braunston

Assistant Coach: Marc Herrera

Goalkeeper Coach: Jay Rayner

2016 
Head Coach and General Manager: Sian Hudson

Assistant Coach: Kristie Braunston

Assistant Coach and Director of Media Relations: Craig Decker

Goalkeeper Coach: Jay Rayner

References

Women's soccer clubs in the United States
USL W-League (1995–2015) teams
Association football clubs established in 1994
Soccer clubs in Colorado
United Women's Soccer teams
Women's soccer clubs in Colorado
Colorado Springs, Colorado